Helmut Geuking (born 16 January 1964) is a German politician who is a Member of the European Parliament for Germany, representing the Family Party of Germany. 
 

He is a member of the European People Party (EPP).

References

Living people
1964 births
MEPs for Germany 2019–2024